Edwin Hayes, R.I. (1819–1904) was an English and Irish marine artist who painted in oil and watercolours.

Life and works
Hayes was born in Bristol, England but brought up in Dublin, Ireland where his father was a hotelier. He studied art at the Dublin Society Art School and first exhibited his work at the RHA (Royal Hibernian Academy) in 1842. He remained in Dublin for ten years before moving to London. He also exhibited at the Royal Academy of Arts, British Institution, Society of British Artists and the Royal Institute of Painters in Watercolours, becoming a full member of the latter in 1863.

Hayes painted seascapes in Ireland, England, Belgium, Holland, France, Spain and Italy, his work invariably featuring ships and boats in high seas, harbour scenes or other aspects of the coastline.

His son Claude Hayes, R.I., ROI, (1852–1922) was also a notable landscape and portrait painter.

A painting by Hayes was featured and restored in a 2021 episode of the BBC Television programme The Repair Shop.

References

Further reading

Walter Strickland. Dictionary of Irish Artists (Shannon: Irish University Press, 1968).

External links

Edwin Hayes (Biog - "Encyclopedia of Irish and World Art")
Edwin Hayes (Biog at Milmo-Penny Fine Art)
Askart biography

British marine artists
English watercolourists
19th-century British painters
19th-century Irish painters
Irish male painters
Landscape artists
Painters from Dublin (city)
1819 births
1904 deaths
Alumni of the National College of Art and Design
Burials at Kensal Green Cemetery
19th-century British male artists
19th-century Irish male artists